Walton Elementary School may refer to:

 Canada
 Walton Elementary School - Coquitlam, British Columbia - School District 43 Coquitlam

 United States
 Maudrie M. Walton Elementary School - Fort Worth, Texas - Fort Worth Independent School District
 Walton Elementary School - Jackson, Mississippi - Jackson Public Schools
 William A. Walton Elementary School - Prince George County, Virginia - Prince George County Schools